The Women's British Basketball League (WBBL) is the top-level women's basketball league in Great Britain, founded on 5 June 2014 as the women's counterpart to the British Basketball League (BBL). The league's headquarters are in Leicester alongside the offices of the men's BBL.

Like the BBL, the organisation uses a franchise-based system so there is no promotion and relegation between the WBBL and the English Women's Basketball League, which forms the lower divisions. Along with the WBBL Championship and the post-season Play-offs, it also runs two knockout competitions featuring all WBBL member teams - the WBBL Cup and WBBL Trophy.

History
Officially approved by the British Basketball League and England Basketball, the newly created Women's British Basketball League was announced to the public on 5 June 2014, and the 2014–15 season was the league's first full season of competition.

The initial line-up included pre-existing teams from England and Wales, competing in a franchise-based organisation similar to the men's British Basketball League model, with no promotion or relegation in operation with the lower leagues. All eight teams from the pre-existing English Basketball League Division One (Women) competition were selected as member clubs, as well as the two finalists from the 2014 Division Two (Women) Play-offs, Brixton Lady TopCats and Leeds Beckett University.  Since the league's inauguration, both Leeds and Brixton have resigned from the league, but three new clubs have joined in that time, including the league's first member club from Scotland.

Corporate structure

Board members
The Women's British Basketball League is run by a 13-person board, which takes all decisions regarding League policies, issues and rules. The director of each member club – or franchise as it is known – sits on the board, ensuring equal representation.

The League is therefore run by these thirteen representatives and is administered by a central office.

The current club representatives on the board of directors are:

Commercial Partners 
The WBBL has thirteen Commercial Partners which are overseen by the Commercial Director, Bob Hope. The Commercial partners include:

 BBC Sport Official Broadcast Partner
 Benecos Official Cosmetics and Toiletries Partner
 Genius Sports Live Game Stats Partner
 Molten Official Ball Partner
 Kappa Official Apparel Partner
 Synergy Video Scouting Partner
 Net1 Official Basketball Product Partner

Teams

Former teams

Competitions

WBBL Championship
The WBBL Championship is the flagship competition of the Women's British Basketball League and features all member teams playing a 22-game regular season (in a round robin format), from October through to April. Matches are played according to FIBA rules and games consist of four-quarters of 10 minutes each. Two points are awarded for a win, with overtime used if the score is tied at the final buzzer – unlimited numbers of 5-minute overtime periods are played until one team is ahead when a period ends. At the end of the regular season, the team with the most points is crowned as WBBL Champions. If points are equal between two or more teams then head-to-head results between said teams are used to determine the winners. In the case of a tie between multiple teams where this does not break the tie, the winners are then determined by the points difference in the games between said teams. Following the completion of the Championship regular season, the top eight ranked teams advance into the post-season Play-offs which usually take place during April.

WBBL Playoffs
The post-season Playoffs usually takes place in April, featuring the top eight ranked teams from the WBBL Championship regular season compete in a knockout tournament. Teams are seeded depending on their final positioning in the Championship standings, so first-place faces eighth-place, second versus seventh-place, third against sixth-place and finally fourth plays the fifth-placed team. Both the Quarter-finals and the succeeding Semi-finals are played over a two-game series (home & away) with the higher seed having choice of home advantage in the either the 1st or 2nd leg – an aggregated score over the two games will determine which team will advance to the next stage. As with the Quarter-finals, teams in the Semi-finals are also seeded, with the highest-ranking team drawn against the lowest-ranking team in one Semi-final and the two remaining teams drawn together in the other Semi-final. The culmination of the post-season is the grand Final, a one-off game played at the end of April, where the winners will be crowned as Play-off Champions.

Betty Codona Trophy
The WBBL Trophy, now officially the Betty Codona Trophy, is an annual pool stage and knockout tournament featuring all WBBL member clubs.

For the first two seasons, pairings were drawn completely at random – there were no seeds, and a draw took place after the majority of fixtures have been played in each round. A preliminary round took place between the lowest-finishing teams in the previous league season, so that the tournament proper started with eight teams in the first round.

From the 2016-17 season, the format was revamped, splitting the teams into a number of geographical groups. The top teams from each group qualify for the semi-finals, which are played as straight knockout ties.

WBBL Cup

The WBBL Cup is an annual knockout competition featuring all WBBL member clubs. It is a straight knockout competition.

Betty Codona Classic

The Betty Codona Classic was an annual three-day tournament named in honour of Betty Codona OBE, a stalwart of women's basketball in Britain for over 50 years and founder of the country's first women's team, Sheffield Hatters. The competition was originally set up as an independent event for the top clubs in Women's basketball and predates the creation of the WBBL by a year, but was adopted as an official WBBL competition after the league was established.

The original format featured the top eight-placed WBBL teams after the first 8 games of regular season play.  For the 2016/2017 edition, the competition was moved to become the opening event for the WBBL season, resulting in a two-tiered format where the Classic Cup was contested by the top four from the previous season's league, with fifth to eighth placed teams from last year's league competing for the Classic Plate.

Individual Awards
The WBBL concludes each season with a number of individual awards based on overall performance from the year.  The three end-of-season awards are; MVP Award (Most Valuable Player - which proposes the player with the best performance over the year); the Young Player of the Year (the best performance of a younger player usually at the age before or during university); and Coach of the Year (the coach with the best performance over the season). The WBBL also awards MVP Awards for the Playoffs, Trophy and Cup finals. In addition, 'Team of the Year' and 'Defensive Team of the Year' places are awarded to demonstrate the best five players in the league as well as the best five defensively players of the year in the league.

See also
 Basketball in England
 British Basketball League
 English Women's Basketball League
 Women's Super League, the Irish equivalent; includes teams from Northern Ireland

References

External links
Official websites:
 Official WBBL website
 The WBBL on Facebook
 The WBBL on Twitter

 
Basketball leagues in the United Kingdom
Britain
Women's basketball competitions in the United Kingdom
Professional sports leagues in the United Kingdom
2014 establishments in the United Kingdom
Sports leagues established in 2014